Good Blood Headbanguers  is the second and currently last studio album by fictional heavy metal band Massacration. The title is a literal translation to English of the Brazilian colloquial expression "sangue bom", meaning a trustworthy person, while the intentional misspelling of "headbangers" is a reference to the fact that the digraph ge is written as gue in Portuguese.

Originally slated for a 2007 release, after a series of delays due to label issues it eventually came out on October 10, 2009 through EMI; its cover art was officially unveiled to the public three days prior alongside an outtake of their previous album Gates of Metal Fried Chicken of Death, "Anal Weapon War". Produced by Roy Z, famous for his work with other bands and artists such as Bruce Dickinson, Judas Priest, Helloween, Halford and Sebastian Bach, it sees the group heading towards a faster, more aggressive sonority influenced by thrash metal, but also experimenting with glam metal elements as seen in the power ballad "The Bull". Famous brega singer Falcão makes a guest appearance on the track "The Mummy", the album's leading single and for which a music video was made; former pornographic actors  and  appear in the music video for "The Bull". Two more music videos were made for "Hammercage Hotdog Hell" and "Sufocators of Metal".

Owing to their 2012–16 hiatus, Good Blood Headbanguers would ultimately be Massacration's final release with guitarist Fausto Fanti ("Blondie Hammett"), who committed suicide on July 30, 2014.

Critical reception
Good Blood Headbanguers received mostly positive reviews upon its release. Writing for Whiplash.net, Thiago El Cid Cardim rated it with 8 stars out of 10, noticing the fact that "[the album's] sonority is way heavier and faster than its predecessor's, probably due to Roy Z's production", and that "the band adopted a visibly glam-/hard rock-inspired aesthetics, more Poison and less Judas Priest". He particularly praised the tracks "The Mummy" and "The Bull". A more mixed review came from G1's Amauri Stamboroski Jr., who comparing it to its predecessor called it "an uneven work mixing good moments with less funny tracks".

In a 2022 interview with Whiplash.net, Bruno Sutter has stated that he himself does not think very highly of Good Blood Headbanguers, claiming that even though the album "has its moments", its production was "kinda rushed" and most of the songs of its second half were "filler", written to finish the album more quickly owing to pressure from EMI.

Track listing

Personnel
Massacration
 Detonator (Bruno Sutter) – lead vocals
 Blondie Hammett (Fausto Fanti) – lead guitar, backing vocals; co-lead vocals (track 4)
 Metal Avenger (Marco Antônio Alves) – bass guitar, backing vocals

Additional musicians
 Falcão – co-lead vocals (track 2)
 Straupelator (Fernando Lima) – drums

Production
 Roy Z – production
 Renato Tribuzy – art direction

Notes
  A. Intentional misspelling of "Suffocators"
  B. From "bosta" (Portuguese for "shit")

References

2009 albums
Massacration albums
Albums produced by Roy Z
EMI Records albums